Manuel António Caldeira (14 December 1926 – 9 August 2014) was a Portuguese footballer who played as a defender.

Club career
Caldeira was born in Vila Real de Santo António, Algarve. He spent nine years of his senior career with Sporting CP after signing from local club Lusitano FC, winning five Primeira Liga championships – four consecutive – and the 1954 edition of the Taça de Portugal.

International career
Over a five-month period, Caldeira earned three caps for Portugal. He made his debut on 19 December 1954 against West Germany, a 0–3 friendly defeat in Lisbon.

Death
Caldeira died on 9 August 2014 in Faro, at the age of 87.

References

External links

1926 births
2014 deaths
People from Vila Real de Santo António
Sportspeople from Faro District
Portuguese footballers
Association football defenders
Primeira Liga players
Liga Portugal 2 players
Sporting CP footballers
Portimonense S.C. players
Portugal international footballers